The Soundtrack of Our Lives, often abbreviated T.S.O.O.L., was a Swedish rock band that formed in Gothenburg in 1995 and disbanded in 2012. The band's style draws heavily from sixties and seventies rock and punk, such as Rolling Stones and Iggy and the Stooges. Psychedelic rock is another strong influence for the band, and psychedelic and mystical references are also prominent in the band's lyrics and aesthetics. The abbreviation 'OEOC', which features on all their albums, refers to the phrase "as above, so below" from Hermeticism.

Formation
The Soundtrack of Our Lives was originally formed by Torbjörn "Ebbot" Lundberg, Björn Olsson, Ian Person, Kalle Gustafsson Jerneholm, Fredrik Sandsten and Martin Hederos. Several members, including vocalist Ebbot Lundberg, had previously played in the punk rock band Union Carbide Productions while Jerneholm had previously released an album with Gothenburg grunge rockers Electric Eskimoes. Olsson, who as guitar player had helped craft the band's sound, left T.S.O.O.L. after its first release, Welcome to the Infant Freebase, to pursue a solo career. He was replaced by Mattias Bärjed, who, like other members, has also engaged in solo and spinoff projects.

Band members
 Ebbot Lundberg – vocals (1995–2012)
 Ian Person – guitar (1995–2012)
 Martin Hederos – keyboards (1995–2012)
 Kalle Gustafsson Jerneholm – bass guitar (1995-2012)
 Fredrik Sandsten – drums (1995–2012)
 Mattias Bärjed – guitar (1997–2012)

Apart from those mentioned instruments, they all played other instruments such as mellotron, dulcimer, cello, piano, sitar, cembalo and others.

Former band member:
 Björn Olsson – guitar (1995–1997)

Tours and releases
The band found critical success in the United States in 2002, with their third album Behind the Music, released the previous year in Sweden and in the rest of Europe. It was nominated for the Best Alternative Album award at the 2003 Grammy Awards. They toured the US in 2002 with Oasis in support of their album Behind the Music.

Their double album Communion was released in November 2008. After a tour of the US the band announced that they were working on their next record Throw It Into the Universe. In October 2010, the band announced it would be releasing their first 'best of' compilation entitled Golden Greats no. 1. According to a statement on their website: "The band has spent much of the summer of 2010 in Svenska Grammofonstudion  where they remastered the original recordings and in part picked up nuances that somehow went missing. With the carefully restored and remastered versions we are invited to TSOOL classics in a way we never heard them before."

In early 2012, the band announced on their website that their latest album, Throw It to the Universe, was complete. The album was released on 18 April 2012.

Lead singer Ebbot Lundberg stated in an interview with Intro Magazine that Throw It to the Universe would be the band's final album, stating that he felt it completed the band's journey. The band performed its last show on 22 December 2012 in Stockholm.

Songs featured in popular culture
Their track "Instant Repeater 99" is played during the closing credits of the 2002 film Spun.

Their track "Sister Surround" was included on the "jukebox" of EA Sports MVP Baseball 2003 while "Karmageddon" is featured on EA Sports' NHL 2005 and FIFA Football 2005''' video games. and in the movie Grand Theft Parsons.  "Sister Surround" was also featured in an episode of Six Feet Under. Their track "Babel On" was featured in MLB 10: The Show.

Their track "Bigtime" featured as the theme of WrestleMania 21 and on the soundtrack of the PAL version of Gran Turismo 4. Their track "Mother One Track Mind" was also featured on the Gran Turismo 4 soundtrack. T.S.O.O.L. songs "Sister Surround" and "Ten Years Ahead" both appear on the In Good Company soundtrack as well.

The song "Second Life Replay" was featured during an episode of the fourth season of Californication'' and "What's Your Story" in season six.

Discography

Studio albums

Compilation albums

EPs

Singles

References

External links
 Official site
 VH1 artist site
 MTV artist site
 June 2009 Interview with L.A. Record
 The Soundtrack of Our Lives collection at the Internet Archive's live music archive
 The Soundtrack of Our Lives at IMDb

Swedish rock music groups
Swedish alternative rock groups
Musical groups established in 1995
English-language singers from Sweden
People from Gothenburg